Happy Days is an American television sitcom that aired first-run on the ABC network from January 15, 1974, to July 19, 1984, with a total of 255 half-hour episodes spanning 11 seasons. Created by Garry Marshall, it was one of the most successful series of the 1970s. The series presented an idealized vision of life in the 1950s and early 1960s Midwestern United States, and it starred Ron Howard as Richie Cunningham, Henry Winkler as his friend Fonzie, and Tom Bosley and Marion Ross as Richie's parents, Howard and Marion Cunningham. Although it opened to mixed reviews from critics, Happy Days became successful and popular over time.

The series began as an unsold pilot starring Howard, Ross and Anson Williams, which aired in 1972 as a segment titled "Love and the Television Set" (later retitled "Love and the Happy Days" for syndication) on ABC's anthology show Love, American Style. Based on the pilot, director George Lucas cast Howard as the lead in his 1973 film American Graffiti, causing ABC to take a renewed interest in the pilot. The first two seasons of Happy Days focused on the experiences and dilemmas of "innocent teenager" Richie Cunningham, his family, and his high school friends, attempting to "honestly depict a wistful look back at adolescence". 

Initially a moderate success, the series' ratings began to fall during its second season, causing Marshall to retool it. The new format emphasized broad comedy and spotlighted the previously minor character of Fonzie, a "cool" biker and high school dropout. Following these changes, Happy Days became the number-one program in television in 1976–1977, Fonzie became one of the most merchandised characters of the 1970s, and Henry Winkler became a major star. The series also spawned a number of spin-offs, including Laverne & Shirley and Mork & Mindy.

Plot 
Set in Milwaukee, Wisconsin, during the 1950s, the series revolves around teenager Richie Cunningham and his family: his father, Howard, who owns a hardware store; traditional homemaker and mother, Marion; younger sister Joanie Cunningham; Richie's older brother Chuck (briefly in seasons 1 and 2 only, disappearing from storylines afterward); and high school dropout, leather jacket clad greaser, mechanic and suave ladies' man Fonzie, who would eventually become Richie's best friend and the Cunninghams' over-the-garage tenant. The earliest episodes revolve around Richie and his friends, Potsie Weber and Ralph Malph, with Fonzie as a secondary character. However, as the series progressed, Fonzie proved to be a favorite with viewers, and soon more story lines were written to reflect his growing popularity; Winkler was top billed in the opening credits alongside Howard, by season 3. Fonzie befriended Richie and the Cunningham family and, when Richie left the series for military service, Fonzie became the central figure of the show, with Winkler receiving sole top billing. In later seasons, other characters were introduced including Fonzie's young cousin, Chachi Arcola, who became a love interest for Joanie Cunningham. 

The series' pilot was originally shown as Love and the Television Set, later retitled Love and the Happy Days for syndication, a one-episode teleplay on the anthology series Love, American Style, aired on February 25, 1972. Happy Days spawned successful television shows Laverne & Shirley and Mork & Mindy as well as three failures, Joanie Loves Chachi, Blansky's Beauties featuring Nancy Walker as Howard's cousin, and Out of the Blue. The show is the basis for the Happy Days musical touring the United States since 2008. The leather jacket worn by Winkler during the series was acquired by the Smithsonian Institution for the permanent collection at the National Museum of American History. The original, light grey McGregor windbreaker Winkler wore during the first season was eventually thrown into the garbage, after ABC relented and allowed the Fonzie character to wear a leather jacket.

Episodes

Cast

Characters

Main 
 Richie Cunningham – The protagonist for the first seven years of the series (1974–80). When Ron Howard left the show due to his burgeoning directorial career, Richie was written out by leaving to join the United States Army. He marries his girlfriend, Lori Beth, in season eight by phone, while Fonzie stands in for him in the wedding. Howard returned for guest appearances as Richie during the show's final season. He came back with Lori Beth and their son, Richie Jr., and Ralph in the season 11 two-part episode, "Welcome Home", and then left for California with Lori Beth and Richie Sr. to pursue a career in screenwriting. He also returned in "Passages", when he and his family attended Joanie and Chachi's wedding.
 Marion Kelp-Cunningham – Wife of Howard Cunningham, mother of Richie and Joanie, and a traditional homemaker. She is the only character who is allowed to call Fonzie by his real first name, Arthur, which she does affectionately. She sometimes gets tired of being at home, such as in "Marion Rebels" where she gets into an argument with Howard and briefly gets a job as a waitress at Arnold's. In "Empty Nest" when Joanie left for Chicago to pursue her music career, Marion had "empty nest syndrome" and was thrilled when her and Howard's niece, K.C., moved in with them. Marion was one of only four characters to remain with the show throughout its entire run.
 Howard Cunningham – Husband of Marion Cunningham, father of Richie and Joanie, business owner of a hardware store called "Cunningham's Hardware", he is a lodge member, and family man. Frequently seen reading the daily newspaper in his easy chair. Enjoys driving his beloved 1948 DeSoto Suburban. In "Letting Go", he did not want Joanie to go to Chicago, still seeing her as his "little girl". But after talking with Fonzie and realizing how much she has grown up, he supports her going. In "Passages", Howard says that he is proud of Richie and Joanie in Joanie and Chachi's wedding. Howard is one of only two characters (the other being Fonzie) to appear in every episode of the series.
 Joanie Cunningham – Richie's younger sister. In early seasons, she is sometimes snooping on Richie's activities and would occasionally be sent to her room by her parents. She is affectionately called "Shortcake" by Fonzie. Later on, Joanie briefly joins a motorcycle gang after going on a date with a boy, whom she considered to be "dull". In "Smokin' Ain't Cool", Joanie started smoking in order to be in a cool club, until Fonzie sets her straight. For years, Fonzie's cousin, Chachi, had been chasing her until she eventually agreed to a date with him. She and Chachi would eventually form a band together; and in "Letting Go", they leave for Chicago to pursue their music career (which spun off the short-lived series Joanie Loves Chachi). Joanie, however, eventually left the band to return home to pursue a teaching career. She and Chachi then broke up for a time until Chachi proposes to her and they get married in the series finale.
 Arthur Fonzarelli, a.k.a. The Fonz or Fonzie – Initially a secondary or recurring character, billed in the end credits, during the first season, he became a popular breakout character and was promoted to front billing by the second season. Fonzarelli's "Fonzie" nickname and comeback phrase, "Sit on it", were created by the show's producer, Bob Brunner. Known for being especially cool and for his catchphrases "(H)eyyyy!" and "Whoa!" His coolness gave him special powers, such as making machinery (such as Arnold's jukebox and other vending machines, electric lights, and car engines) function by pounding on them with his fist, or getting the attention of girls by snapping his fingers. His parents abandoned him as a child and his grandmother raised him from the age of four.
 Warren "Potsie" Weber – Richie's best friend and an aspiring and talented singer. He is somewhat more carefree and worldly than Richie in early seasons, then in mid-seasons, he becomes more often paired with Ralph for plots, and the two became inseparable. In later seasons, his character evolves to increasingly emphasize his dimwitted side, and Ralph would often say to him "You're such a Potsie". Potsie often lightheartedly mentioned the supposed hatred his father (who never appeared on the show) had for him. Potsie remained with the show after Richie and Ralph joined the Army; however, he was seen less frequently. While Potsie's character became underdeveloped in these later episodes (and he, along with Ralph, was one of the few characters absent from the finale), he is mentioned to regularly bowl with the Cunninghams and still continues his position as assistant manager of Cunningham Hardware and as pledge master of the Leopard Lodge. His nickname is explained in the 6th episode, "The Deadly Dares", originating in childhood, via his mother, as he enjoyed making clay pottery.
 Ralph Malph – In the first season, Ralph was intended as more of a secondary character, billed in the end credits, along with Winkler and Moran, but by season 2, Ralph was from billed with them. Richie, Potsie and Ralph often were intertwined as episode protagonists. Ralph and Potsie would became roommates by the fifth season. Ralph was occasionally seen wearing his red GEMS club jacket, especially in the early seasons, but nothing was ever mentioned of it or the club. Known for saying "I still got it!" after delivering one of his jokes. Ralph left with Richie after the 1979–80 season to join the Army. Ralph returned as a guest star in the final season, although he is absent in the finale (along with Potsie)—he is mentioned as having left to continue college to become an optometrist like his father.
 Mitsumo "Arnold" Takahashi (Noriyuki "Pat" Morita) (seasons 3, 10–11: 26 episodes) is the owner of Arnold's Drive-In season three (1975–76). He obtained the moniker when he purchased Arnold's restaurant and people thought it was named after him, explaining that it was too costly to buy enough letter signs needed to rename it "Takahashi". He moonlighted as a martial arts instructor, teaching self-defense classes at the drive-in after hours. Morita also played "Arnold" as a guest star in 1977 and 1979 before returning as a recurring character after Al Molinaro departed in 1982.
 Chachi Arcola (Scott Baio) – Fonzie's younger cousin and later Al Delvecchio's stepson.  Fonzie acts as his older brother/father figure. He has much of Fonzie's smoothness and charisma, "wah wah wah" being his catchphrase. Chachi becomes "one of the guys" , joining Richie, Potsie, Ralph, and Fonzie in their antics and as their bandmate/drummer. After Richie and Ralph leave the show (season 7 finale), Chachi and Fonzie often find trouble or plot-conflicts together. Chachi has a crush on Joanie Cunningham from the moment he meets her in season 5, but she initially thinks of him as a little kid, calling him pejorative terms like "shrimp" or "drip". But as they enter high school, she too begins to find him attractive and begin dating. In season 11, they break-up, but as the season progresses, they reunite. The series finale features Chachi and Joanie's wedding.

 Al Delvecchio – From seasons four to nine (1976–82), Al became the new owner and cook of the drive-in diner, after Arnold got married the previous season. Al later married Chachi's mother Louisa, thereby becoming Chachi's stepfather and Fonzie's uncle. Molinaro left Happy Days in 1982 to take his "Al" character to Joanie Loves Chachi, and he returned as Al in three later episodes of Happy Days. Known for sighing "Yeeep, yep, yep, yep, yep" when he was disappointed or when things did not go his way.
  (Cathy Silvers) – Joanie's boy-crazy best friend (1980–83), frequently mentioned but never seen in early episodes. She made her first on-screen appearance in the eighth season and remained a recurring character through the ninth season, becoming a regular during the tenth season in 1983. She returned as a guest star in the 1984 series finale. Jenny's father, played by Cathy Silvers' real-life father Phil Silvers, appeared in one episode.
 Roger Phillips (Ted McGinley) – Marion's nephew; coach and teacher at Jefferson High, until "Vocational Education" where he became principal at Patton High. Introduced in 1980 after Richie left the show as a recurring character.
 Lori Beth Allen-Cunningham (Lynda Goodfriend) – Richie's girlfriend and later his wife (1977–82). She married Richie by phone in season eight. Fonzie helped Lori Beth deliver her baby in "Little Baby Cunningham". She returned as a guest star in the final season, where she is revealed to be pregnant with her second baby.
 Ashley Pfister (Linda Purl) – Divorced mother who becomes Fonzie's steady girlfriend until they break up offscreen sometime before "Where the Guys Are". (Purl also portrays Richie's part-time girlfriend Gloria in season 2.)

Minor/recurring 
 Marsha Simms (Beatrice Colen) (seasons 1–3, 5; 22 episodes) – A carhop waitress in the first 3 seasons with comic sides and plot development appearances. She returned for a flashback (guest) appearance in the episode "Our Gang".
 Bobby Melner (Harris Kal) (seasons 8–11; 19 episodes) – Friend of Chachi and Joanie seen in episodes after Richie and Ralph left the show. He is a student in Fonzie's auto shop class, as well as in Roger's health class. At one point, he was also on the Jefferson High basketball team, and performed in a band with Joanie and Chachi.
 K.C. Cunningham (Crystal Bernard) (season 10; 15 episodes) – Howard's niece. She moved in with Howard and Marion after Joanie left for Chicago. She left an all-girls boarding school in Texas because it closed down. Her parents are always traveling. She also became friends with Jenny and she went on her first date with Melvin.
 Leopold "Flip" Phillips (Billy Warlock) (seasons 9 & 10; 13 episodes) – Roger's rebellious younger brother. He usually wears a shirt cut off over his bellybutton.
 Tommy (Kevin Sullivan) (seasons 8–11; 13 episodes) – Another friend of Chachi and Joanie in episodes after Richie and Ralph left the show. Like Bobby, Tommy is a student in Fonzie's auto shop class, as well as in Roger's health class. At one point, he was also on the Jefferson High basketball team, and performed in a band with Joanie and Chachi.
 Heather Pfister (Heather O'Rourke) (season 10; 12 episodes) – Ashley Pfister's daughter. Initially did not get along with Fonzie, but gradually learned to accept him as a father figure.
  Charles "Chuck" Cunningham (Gavan O'Herlihy, Randolph Roberts) (seasons 1 & 2; 11 episodes) – The oldest son of Howard and Marion Cunningham and older brother of Richie and Joanie, Chuck is a college student and basketball player. He is rarely seen and disappears without explanation in season three, never to be seen nor referenced again after season 2's "Fish and Fins". The character's disappearance gave rise to the term "Chuck Cunningham Syndrome", used to describe TV characters that disappear from shows without an in-universe explanation and are nowhere to be seen or mentioned again. Gavan O'Herlihy played Chuck, but then he asked to leave the series. He was replaced by Randolph Roberts. In several late-season episodes, Howard and/or Marion make reference to being "very proud of our two children", with no on-screen reference to Chuck.
 Eugene Belvin (Denis Mandel) (seasons 8 & 9; 10 episodes) – Nerdy classmate of Joanie and Chachi, and twin brother of Melvin Belvin. Is in Fonzie's auto shop class, and has a crush on Jenny Piccolo. Despite being a general stooge to his classmates at Jefferson High, he frequently tags along with Joanie and Chachi's circle of friends.
 "Bag" Zombroski (Neil J. Schwartz) (seasons 1–4; 9 episodes) – A Jefferson High schoolmate, drummer of Richie's band and a leader of a jacket club called "The Demons".
 Police Officer Kirk / Army Reserve Major Kirk (Ed Peck) (seasons 3–10; 9 episodes) – Fonzie's nemesis and antagonist, who's eager to demonstrate his inflated sense of authority, and on the watch for delinquents and "pinkos" (communists). Kirk took over as acting Sheriff following the untimely death of Sheriff Flanaghan.
 Wendy (Misty Rowe) (season 2; 8 episodes) – A carhop from Arnold's in season two. She was paired with Marsha Simms in 5 episodes.
 Trudy (Tita Bell) (seasons 1-4; 8 episodes) Jefferson High classmate, Potsie's & Fonzie's date in various episodes
 Melvin Belvin (Scott Bernstein) (seasons 9 & 10; 8 episodes) – Nerdy classmate of Joanie and Chachi, and twin brother of Eugene Belvin. Like his brother, Melvin frequently tags along with Joanie's and Chachi's circle of friends. He once went on a date with K.C. Cunningham.
 Leather Tuscadero (Suzi Quatro) (seasons 5 & 6; 7 episodes) – Musician; younger sister of Pinky Tuscadero, and a former juvenile delinquent; formed her own girl group called "Leather and the Suedes". Richie, Ralph, Potsie and Chachi become her (nameless) backup band. They  perform "The Fonzie", a new dance song on Chicago's Sock Hop, teen TV dance show.
 Jennifer Jerome (Lorrie Mahaffey) (seasons 5 & 6; 6 episodes) – Potsie's steady girlfriend. Mahaffey was Anson Williams' then wife.
 Laverne De Fazio (Penny Marshall) and Shirley Feeney (Cindy Williams) (seasons 3, 6 & 7; 5 episodes) – Dating interest of Fonzie, Laverne, and her friend, Shirley, appeared prominently in three episodes during season three ("A Date with Fonzie", "Football Frolics", and "Fonzie the Superstar"), which led to the two starring in the spin-off series Laverne & Shirley; they also make guest appearances in season six's "Fonzie's Funeral (Part 2)" and season seven's "Shotgun Wedding" (Part 1) (the second part of "Shotgun Wedding" concluded on a crossover episode of Laverne and Shirley.)
 Louisa Arcola-Delvecchio (Ellen Travolta) (seasons 8–11; 5 episodes) – Mother of Chachi Arcola; aunt of Fonzie. She married Al Delvecchio and they moved to Chicago.
 Gloria (Linda Purl) (season 2; 5 episodes) – Richie's occasional girlfriend in season two.
 Dr. Mickey Malph (Alan Oppenheimer, Jack Dodson) (season 3 & 4, 7; 4 episodes) – Ralph's father, an optometrist and, like his son, a self-styled comedian. Briefly separated from his wife Minnie, but apparently resolved issues with her after a talk with Ralph. It was Dr. Malph who convinced Fonzie to wear glasses after he started having vision problems.
 Raymond "Spike" Fonzarelli (Danny Butch) (seasons 2–4; 4 episodes) – Fonzie's cousin (often referred to as his nephew, but Fonzie explains that he couldn't be his nephew as Fonzie was an only child) and his copycat. He went on a date with Joanie in "Not with My Sister, You Don't" and made only fleeting appearances before the introduction of Chachi. The kinship between Spike and Chachi was never explained.
 Grandma Nussbaum (Frances Bay) (seasons 3, 9, 10 & 11: 4 episodes) – Chachi Arcola and Fonzie's grandmother. Grandma Nussbaum was played by Lillian Bronson in the season 3 episode, "Fonzie Moves In". She has been married several times, and now enjoys playing mahjong & canasta
 Carol "Pinky" Tuscadero (Roz Kelly) (season 4; 3 episodes) – Former girlfriend of Fonzie and a traveling demolition derby driver.
 Clarence (Gary Friedkin) (season 10; 3 episodes) – A cook at Arnold's who is referred to several times throughout the show, but never actually seen until the episode "A Woman Not Under the Influence". There, it is revealed that Clarence is a little person. Clarence seems to have a good relationship with Al, but also frequently upsets him while goofing off in the kitchen.
 Bill "Sticks" Downey (John-Anthony Bailey) (season 3; 2 episodes) – Friend of Fonzie, Richie, Potsie and Ralph and drummer for their band, hence his nickname "Sticks", though he claimed he got the nickname because he was skinny.

Notable guest stars 
 Hank Aaron, the Atlanta Braves home run king, appeared in season 7, episode 19
 Adam Arkin in one of his first TV roles, as Bo, a disgruntled boyfriend that threatens Richie at a lodge dance (season 2, "Fonzie Joins the Band")
 Frankie Avalon appeared as himself (in season 9), singing his signature song "Venus" to a swooning Jenny Piccolo at the Leopard Lodge's annual "Poo Bah Doodah" musical
 Ed Begley Jr. as a leader in the "Demons" (jacket club) (season 1, episode 6 "The Deadly Dares")
 Dr. Joyce Brothers (season 5, episode 19) appears as herself, trying to help Fonzie's dog, Spunky, out of a depression
 Julie Brown made her television debut in the seventh-season episode "Ahhh Wilderness" as one of three girls who went camping with Richie, Fonzie et al.
 Leslie Browne as Colleen, a talented ballerina that wins Fonzi's heart (season 6), but must pursue her dreams in New York City 
 Didi Conn a Jefferson High student who convinces Richie he caught mono from Fonzi's girl (season 2)
 Jeff Conaway as Rocko, a leather jacket wearing greaser who intimidates Richie at Arnold's while playing pinball (season 3, ep 6 )
 Morgan Fairchild (season 5, episode 10) as a snooty, rich socialite who tries to humiliate Fonzie
 Herbie Faye appeared as 'Pop' in the 1974, season 1 episode "Knock Around the Block"
 Lorne Greene made a brief walk-on cameo during the season five premiere, which took place in Hollywood
 Tom Hanks a karate black-belt and disgruntled third grade classmate seeking revenge on Fonzie for pushing him off a swing; just as Fonzie is about to be given a community leader award
 John Hart (TV's The Lone Ranger) appeared in season 9, episode 17 where Fonzie meets his childhood idol (Hart's last acting job)
 Clint Howard as Moose, a burglar who robs Arnold's (cash register) after hours, with Spike's help in "Bringing Up Spike" (season 3)
 Diana Hyland as Adriana Prescott, a married bon vivant/swinger that Fonzi dates until he learns of her marital status and open marriage arrangement
 Christopher Knight as Binky, Joanie's date on the season five episode "Be My Valentine"
 Cheryl Ladd appeared in "Wish Upon a Star" (season 2), playing the part of Cindy Shea, a 'wholesome' Hollywood starlet with whom Richie wins a Homecoming date
 Anne Lockhart college gal on Spring Break in a rented cabin on Lake Whitefish, "3 On A Porch" (season  3)
 June Lockhart as Judge McBride, who presides over the small claims court case of H. Cunningham vs. A. Fonzarelli, in "Two Angry Men" (season 3)
 Dave Madden (of The Partridge Family) as compromised game show host, Jack Whippet, who gives a reluctant Richie the answer to a $5,000 baseball-trivia jackpot prize, (season 2) "Big Money"
 Michael McKean and David L. Lander, of Laverne & Shirley, portrayed their "Lenny" and "Squiggy" characters in the sixth-season episode "Fonzie's Funeral (Part 2)"
 Eddie Mekka, also from Laverne & Shirley, portrayed his "Carmine" character in the season four's "Joanie's Weird Boyfriend" and the season six's "Fonzie's Funeral (Part 2)"
 Maureen McCormick (Marcia Brady of The Brady Bunch) as "Hildie" the Eastchester girlfriend of Dragon's drag-racer, Doolie, that Richie must race in his dad's Desoto, (season 2, episode 16)
 James Millhollin, a character actor, made the last television appearance of his career as Mr. Rudi in the 1979 episode "Potsie Quits School"
 James Randi ("The Amazing Randi") appeared as himself in the episode "The Magic Show" (season 6)
 Tony Randall uncredited cameo, as a man who's a 'werewolf', (onscreen) in a movie that Richie, Joanie and their dates are watching, (season 2, ep 8) "Not With My Sister, You Don't"
 Buffalo Bob Smith (and Bob Brunner as Clarabell the Clown) appeared in the episode "The Howdy Doody Show" (season 2); the characters come to town looking for Howdy Doody look-alikes
 Craig Stevens, the star of detective show Peter Gunn played Ashley Pfister's father in "Hello Pfisters" (season 10)
 Danny Thomas appeared in the episode "Grandpa's Visit" (season 5) as Sean Cunningham, Howard's father.
 Charlene Tilton appeared in the episode "They Shoot Fonzies, Don't They?" (season 4) as Jill Higgins, who challenges Fonzie and Joanie at a dance marathon until Fonzie might have to get a crewcut.
 Dick Van Patten as Phil Hunsberger, a bank loan officer, in "Fonzie the Salesman" (season 3) and embittered, vice principal Connors ("The Graduation" ssn 4)
 Robin Williams appeared in two episodes as Mork from Ork; in season five's "My Favorite Orkan", Mork wants to take Richie back to Ork with him to study earthlings, which led to the spin-off Mork & Mindy; season six's "Mork Returns" aired during the height of the popularity of Mork and Mindy
 Lyle Waggoner appeared in the episode "Dreams Can Come True" (season 8) as Bobby Burns, host of the game show of the same name, on which Marion appears as a contestant, and again in the episode "Like Mother, Like Daughter" (season 11) as Frederick Hamilton, Marion's former college boyfriend

Production 

Happy Days originated during a time of 1950s nostalgic interest as evident in 1970s film, television, and music. In late winter of 1971, Michael Eisner was snowed in at Newark airport where he bumped into Tom Miller, head of development at Paramount. Eisner has stated that he told Miller, "Tom, this is ridiculous. We're wasting our time here. Let's write a show." The script treatment that came out of that did not sell. But in spite of the market research department telling them that the 1950s theme would not work, they decided to redo it, and this was accepted as a pilot. This unsold pilot was filmed in late 1971 and titled New Family in Town, with Harold Gould in the role of Howard Cunningham, Marion Ross as Marion, Ron Howard as Richie, Anson Williams as Potsie, Ric Carrott as Charles "Chuck" Cunningham, and Susan Neher as Joanie. Paramount passed on making it into a weekly series, and the pilot was recycled with the title Love and the Television Set (later retitled Love and the Happy Days for syndication), for presentation on the television anthology series Love, American Style. Also in 1971, the musical Grease had a successful opening in Chicago, and by the following year became successful on Broadway. Also in 1972, George Lucas asked to view the pilot to determine if Ron Howard would be suitable to play a teenager in American Graffiti, then in pre-production. Lucas immediately cast Howard in the film, which became one of the top-grossing films of 1973. With the movie's success generating a renewed interest in the 1950s era (although, the film was set in 1962), TV show creator Garry Marshall and ABC recast the unsold pilot to turn Happy Days into a series. According to Marshall in an interview, executive producer Tom Miller said while developing the sitcom, "If we do a TV series that takes place in another era, and when it goes into reruns, then it won't look old." This made sense to Marshall while on the set of the show.

Gould had originally been tapped to reprise the role of Howard Cunningham on the show. However, during a delay before the start of production he found work doing a play abroad and when he was notified the show was ready to begin production, he declined to return because he wanted to honor his commitment. Bosley was then offered the role.

Production and scheduling notes 
 Jerry Paris, who played next-door neighbor Jerry Helper on The Dick Van Dyke Show and directed 84 episodes of that series, directed every episode of Happy Days from season three on, except for three episodes in season three ("Jailhouse Rock", "Dance Contest" and "Arnold's Wedding").
 Producer and writer Bob Brunner created Arthur Fonzarelli's "Fonzie" nickname and his iconic comeback phrase, "Sit on it."
 Beginning in September 1979 until the show went out of production, reruns of the show were syndicated under the title Happy Days Again.
 Happy Days was produced by Miller-Milkis Productions, a teaming of Thomas L. Miller with former film editor Edward K. Milkis, which became Miller-Milkis-Boyett Productions when Robert L. Boyett joined the company in 1980, and was the first-ever show to be produced by the company's most recent incarnation, Miller-Boyett Productions, which followed Milkis's resignation from the partnership. It was also produced by Henderson Productions and was one of the popular shows produced in association with Paramount Television.
 In its 11 seasons on the air, Happy Days is the second-longest-running sitcom in ABC's history (behind The Adventures of Ozzie and Harriet, which ran 14 seasons, from 1952 to 1966), and one of the longest-running primetime programs in the network's history. It is also unique in that it remained in the same time slot, leading off ABC's Tuesday night programming at 8:00 p.m. Eastern/Pacific (7:00 p.m. in the Central and Mountain zones) for its first ten seasons. That half-hour became a signature timeslot for ABC, with Who's the Boss? instantly entering the top 10 when it was moved from Thursdays and staying in that time slot for six seasons, followed by the equally family-friendly sitcom Full House (another Miller-Boyett co-production). That sitcom also hit the top 10 immediately after inheriting the Tuesday at 8:00/7:00 p.m. slot and then stayed there for four seasons.
 Happy Days also proved to be quite popular in daytime reruns; they joined the ABC daytime schedule in 1975, airing reruns at 11:30 a.m. ET (10:30 a.m. CT/MT/PT), being moved to 11:00/10:00 a.m. in 1977, paired with Family Feud following at 11:30/10:30 a.m. It was replaced on the daytime schedule by reruns of its spin-off, Laverne & Shirley, in April 1979.
 CBS programming head Fred Silverman scheduled the Maude spin-off Good Times directly against Happy Days during their respective second seasons in an attempt to kill the ABC show's growing popularity. In a way this move backfired on Silverman, as he was named president of ABC in 1975, thus forcing him to come up with a way to save the show he tried to kill the year before. After having knocked Happy Days out of the top 20 programs on television his last year at CBS, Silverman had the series at the top of the Nielsen ratings by 1977 (see below). Good Times was later cancelled in 1979.
 Ron Howard later revealed that many of the exterior scenes filmed in Happy Days were actually shot in Munster, Indiana.
 The official series finale ("Passages") aired on May 8, 1984. But there were five "leftover" episodes that ABC didn't have time to air during the regular season due to the Winter Olympics and the spring run of a.k.a. Pablo. Four of these aired on Thursday nights during the summer of 1984; the fifth ("Fonzie's Spots") aired on September 24, 1984.

Production styles 
The first two seasons of Happy Days (1974–75) were filmed using a single-camera setup and laugh track. One episode of season two ("Fonzie Gets Married") was filmed in front of a studio audience with three cameras as a test run. From the third season on (1975–84), the show was a three-camera production in front of a live audience (with a cast member, usually Tom Bosley, announcing in voice-over, "Happy Days is filmed before a live audience" at the start of most episodes), giving these later seasons a markedly different style. A laugh track was still used during post-production to smooth over live reactions.

Garry Marshall's earlier television series The Odd Couple had undergone an identical change in production style after its first season in 1970–71.

Sets 

The show had two main sets: the Cunningham home and Arnold's/Al's Drive-In.

In seasons one and two, the Cunningham house was arranged with the front door on the left and the kitchen on the right of screen, in a triangular arrangement. From season three on, the house was rearranged to accommodate multiple cameras and a studio audience.

The Cunninghams' official address is 565 North Clinton Drive, Milwaukee, Wisconsin. The house that served as the exterior of the Cunningham residence is actually located at 565 North Cahuenga Boulevard (south of Melrose Avenue) in Los Angeles, several blocks from the Paramount lot on Melrose Avenue.

The Milky Way Drive-In, located on Port Washington Road in the North Shore suburb of Glendale, Wisconsin (now Kopp's Frozen Custard Stand), was the inspiration for the original Arnold's Drive-In; it has since been demolished. The exterior of Arnold's was a standing set on the Paramount Studios lot that has since been demolished. This exterior was close to Stage 19, where the rest of the show's sets were located.

The set of the diner in the first season was a room with the same vague details of the later set, such as the paneling, and the college pennants. When the show changed to a studio production in 1975, the set was widened and the entrance was hidden, but allowed an upstage, central entrance for cast members. The barely-seen kitchen was also upstaged and seen only through a pass-through window. The diner had orange booths, downstage center for closeup conversation, as well as camera left. There were two restroom doors camera right, labeled "Guys" and "Dolls". A 1953 Seeburg Model G jukebox (with replaced metal pilasters from Wico Corp.) was positioned camera right, and an anachronistic "Nip-It" pinball machine (actually produced in 1972) was positioned far camera right.

College pennants adorned the walls, including Purdue and University of Wisconsin–Milwaukee, along with a blue and white sign reading "Jefferson High School". Milwaukee's Washington High School provided the inspiration for the exteriors of the fictional Jefferson.

In a two-part episode from the seventh season, the original Arnold's Drive-In was written out of the series as being destroyed by fire (see List of Happy Days episodes, episodes 159 and 160). In the last seasons that covered the 1960s timeline, a new Arnold's Drive-In set (to portray the new Arnold's that replaced the original Arnold's destroyed by the fire) emerged in a 1960s decor with wood paneling and stained glass. Also, in seasons 8 and 9, the new drive-in was named "Fonzie & Big Al" because Fonzie and Al co-owned the new establishment in a partnership.

In 2004, two decades after the first set was destroyed, the Happy Days 30th Anniversary Reunion requested that the reunion take place in Arnold's. The set was rebuilt by production designer James Yarnell based on the original floor plan. The reunion special was taped at CBS Television City's Bob Barker Studio in September 2004.

Theme music 

Season one used a newly recorded version of "Rock Around the Clock" by Bill Haley & His Comets (recorded in the fall of 1973) as the opening theme song. This recording was not commercially released at the time, although the original 1954 recording returned to the American Billboard charts in 1974 as a result of the song's use on the show. The "Happy Days" recording had its first commercial release in 2005 by the German label Hydra Records. (When Happy Days entered syndication in 1979, the series was retitled Happy Days Again and used an edited version of the 1954 recording instead of the 1973 version.) In some prints intended for reruns and overseas broadcasts, as well as on the Season 2 DVD set release and later re-releases of the Season 1 DVD set, the original "Rock Around the Clock" opening theme is replaced by the more standard "Happy Days" theme, because of music rights issues.

The show's closing theme song in seasons one and two was a fragment from "Happy Days" (although in a different recording with a different lyric from that which would become the standard version), whose music was composed by Charles Fox and whose lyric was written by Norman Gimbel. According to SAG, this version was performed by Jim Haas on lead vocals, The Ron Hicklin Singers, Stan Farber, Jerry Whitman, and Gary Garrett on backing vocals, and studio musicians.

From seasons three to ten inclusive, a longer version of "Happy Days" replaced "Rock Around the Clock" at the beginning of the show. Released as a single in 1976 by Pratt & McClain, "Happy Days" cracked the Top 5. The show itself finished the 1976–77 television season at No. 1, ending the five-year Nielsen reign of All in the Family.

For the show's 11th and final season (1983–84), the theme was rerecorded in a more modern style. It featured Bobby Arvon on lead vocals, with several back-up vocalists. To accompany this new version, new opening credits were filmed, and the flashing Happy Days logo was reanimated to create an overall "new" feel which incorporated 1980s sensibilities with 1950s nostalgia (although by this time the show was set in 1965).

Merchandising revenue lawsuit 
On April 19, 2011, Happy Days co-stars Erin Moran, Don Most, Marion Ross and Anson Williams, as well as the estate of Tom Bosley (who died in 2010), filed a $10 million breach-of-contract lawsuit against CBS, which owns the show, claiming they had not been paid for merchandising revenues owed under their contracts. The cast members claimed they had not received revenues from show-related items, including comic books, T-shirts, scrapbooks, trading cards, games, lunch boxes, dolls, toy cars, magnets, greeting cards and DVDs where their images appear on the box covers. Under their contracts, they were supposed to be paid 5% of the net proceeds of merchandising if their sole image were used, and half that amount if they were in a group. CBS said it owed the actors $8,500 and $9,000 each, most of it from slot machine revenues, but the group said they were owed millions. The lawsuit was initiated after Ross was informed by a friend playing slots at a casino of a Happy Days machine on which players win the jackpot when five Marion Rosses are rolled.

In October 2011, a judge rejected the group's fraud claim, which meant they could not receive millions of dollars in potential damages. On June 5, 2012, a judge denied a motion filed by CBS to have the case thrown out, which meant it would go to trial on July 17 if the matter was not settled by then. In July 2012, the actors settled their lawsuit with CBS. Each received a payment of $65,000 and a promise by CBS to continue honoring the terms of their contracts.

Legacy 
In 1978, actor Robin Williams made his screen debut during the fifth season of Happy Days, as the character "Mork" in the episode "My Favorite Orkan." Sought after as a last-minute cast replacement for a departing actor, Williams impressed the producer with his quirky sense of humor when he sat on his head when asked to take a seat for the audition. While portraying Mork on Happy Days, Williams improvised much of his dialogue and physical comedy, speaking in a high, nasal voice, and he made the most of the script. The cast and crew, as well as TV network executives were deeply impressed with his performance. As such, the executives moved quickly to get the performer on contract just four days later before competitors could make their own offers.
 
In 1980, the  National Museum of American History, Smithsonian Institution asked Henry Winkler to donate one of Fonzie's leather jackets.

In 1985,  Jon Hein developed the phrase jumping the shark in response to an episode of Happy Days, (Season 5, Episode 91) called "Hollywood: Part 3, written by Fred Fox, Jr. which aired on September 20, 1977. In this episode, Fonzie jumps over a shark while on water-skis. The phrase is used to suggest that a creative outlet appears to be making a misguided attempt at generating new attention or publicity for something that is perceived to be once, but no longer, widely popular. In a 2019 interview with NPR, Terry Gross asked Henry Winkler (Fonzie) what it was "about that scene or that episode that came to signify when something's time is up - when it's over?" Winkler responded: "You know what? I don't know. To them, the Fonz water skiing was just like the last straw. The only thing is it wasn't to the audience because we were No. 1 for years after that. So it didn't much matter to anybody." In addition, he told TheWrap in 2018 that he is "not embarrassed" by the phrase. He stated that "newspapers would mention jumping the shark...and they would show a picture of me in my leather jacket and swim shorts water-skiing. And at that time I had great legs. So I thought, ‘I don't care.’ And we were No. 1 for the next four or five years." As his character Barry Zuckerkorn (in the sitcom Arrested Development) hopped over a shark in Episode 13 of the second season, Winkler also noted that there "was a book, there was a board game and it is an expression that is still used today ... [and] I'm very proud that I am the only actor, maybe in the world, that has jumped the shark twice — once on Happy Days, and once on Arrested Development.”

In 1999 TV Guide ranked Fonzie as number 4 on its 50 Greatest TV Characters of All Time list. 

In a 2001 poll conducted by Channel 4 in the UK, the Fonz was ranked 13th on their list of the 100 Greatest TV Characters.

In 2008, American artist Gerald P. Sawyer, unveiled the Bronze Fonz (a public artwork) on the Milwaukee Riverwalk in downtown Milwaukee, Wisconsin.

Home media 
Paramount Home Entertainment and CBS DVD have released the first six seasons of Happy Days on DVD in Region 1, as of December 2, 2014. For the second season, CBS features music replacements due to copyright issues, including the theme song "Rock Around the Clock". ('The Complete First Season' retains the original opening, as it was released before CBS was involved.) Only season 3 and 4 of the DVD release contain the original music. The sixth season was released on December 2, 2014. It is unknown if the remaining 5 seasons will be released.

The season 7 premiere "Shotgun Wedding: Part 1" was also released on the Laverne & Shirley season 5 DVD. To date, this is the last episode released on home media.

Seasons 1 to 4 have also been released on DVD in the UK and in regions 2 and 4.

Reunion specials 
There have been two reunion specials which aired on ABC: the first was The Happy Days Reunion Special originally aired in March 1992, followed by Happy Days: 30th Anniversary Reunion in February 2005 to commemorate the program's 30th anniversary. Both were set up in interview/clip format.

Spin-offs 
Happy Days resulted in seven different spin-off series, including two that were animated: Laverne & Shirley, Blansky's Beauties, Mork & Mindy, Out of the Blue, Joanie Loves Chachi, The Fonz and the Happy Days Gang (animated) and Laverne & Shirley with The Fonz (animated).
 The most successful of these spin-offs, Laverne & Shirley (1976–83) starring Penny Marshall and Cindy Williams, respectively, also took place in early/mid-1960s Milwaukee. As Shotz Brewery workers, modeled after the Miller, Schlitz, and Pabst Breweries once located in Milwaukee, Laverne and Shirley find themselves in adventures with The Fonz, Lenny and Squiggy and even the Cunninghams also living in the midwestern city. The two starring characters eventually moved to Los Angeles in the show's later years. Penny Marshall was the sister of producer Garry Marshall. Happy Days and Laverne & Shirley had a crossover episode, "Shotgun Wedding", in which Richie and Fonzie get into trouble with a farmer for courting his daughters, and Laverne and Shirley try to help them. Part one is the season seven premiere of Happy Days and part two is the season five premiere of Laverne & Shirley.
 After Robin Williams appeared as Mork in "My Favorite Orkan", he was given his own sitcom, Mork & Mindy (1978–82). In this series, Mork is an alien from the planet Ork, who lands in 1970s Boulder, Colorado, to study humans. He moves in with Pam Dawber's character of Mindy McConnell. 
 Joanie Loves Chachi (1982–83) was a short-lived show about Richie's younger sister Joanie and Fonzie's younger cousin Chachi's relationship during their years as musicians in Chicago. While commonly believed that the show was canceled due to low ratings, the program finished in the Top 20 its first season, but ABC determined that the show was losing too much of its lead-in, suggesting low appeal if the show were moved (a suggestion that came to be realized, as the show's ratings dropped dramatically after a move to another time slot in its second season). This type of cancellation seemed strange in the early 1980s, but soon became a commonplace part of TV audience research.
 Out of the Blue (1979) is a spin-off of Happy Days, though a scheduling error had the series airing prior to the main character's introduction on Happy Days.
 Blansky's Beauties (1977) starred Nancy Walker as former Las Vegas showgirl Nancy Blansky. One week before the show's premiere, the Blansky character appeared on Happy Days as a cousin of Howard Cunningham. Scott Baio and Lynda Goodfriend co-starred before joining Happy Days the following fall, and Pat Morita reprised his role of Arnold. Similarly, Eddie Mekka of Laverne & Shirley played the cousin of his Carmine character, while pulling double duty as a regular in both shows.

Spin-off pilots that did not succeed include The Ralph and Potsie Show as well as The Pinky Tuscadero Show.

In other media

Books 
A series of novels based on characters and dialog of the series was written by William Johnston and published by Tempo Books in the 1970s.

Comic books 
Western Publishing published a Happy Days comic book series in 1979 under their Gold Key Comics brand and Whitman Comics brand.

Animation 
There are two animated series, both produced by Hanna-Barbera Productions in association with Paramount Television (now known as CBS Television Distribution). The Fonz and the Happy Days Gang ran from 1980 to 1982. There are also animated spin-offs of Laverne & Shirley (Laverne & Shirley in the Army) and Mork & Mindy (centering on a young Mork and Mindy in high school). The following season, they were connected together as Mork & Mindy/Laverne & Shirley/Fonz Hour (1982).

Musicals 
In the late 1990s, a touring arena show called Happy Days: The Arena Spectacular toured Australia's major cities. The story featured a property developer, and former girlfriend of Fonzie's, called Miss Frost (Rebecca Gibney), wanting to buy the diner and redevelop it. It starred Craig McLachlan as Fonzie, Max Gillies and Wendy Hughes as Mr. and Mrs. Cunningham, Doug Parkinson as Al, and Jo Beth Taylor as Richie's love interest Laura. Tom Bosley presented an introduction before each performance live on stage, and pop group Human Nature played a 1950s-style rock group.

Another stage show, Happy Days: A New Musical, began touring in 2008.

Music videos
The music video for the song Buddy Holly (which takes place at Arnold's Drive-in) by Weezer features footage from the series, including clips of Richie, Potsie, Ralph Malph, Joanie, and Fonzie. Al Molinaro also reprises his role as Al Delvecchio in the video, joking about how bad his fish is at the beginning and end of the video.

See also 

 Fonz (video game)

Notes

References

External links 

 
  results

 
1974 American television series debuts
1984 American television series endings
1970s American sitcoms
1980s American teen sitcoms
American Broadcasting Company original programming
American television spin-offs
English-language television shows
Nielsen ratings winners
Television shows adapted into plays
Television shows adapted into novels
Television series about families
Television series about teenagers
Teenage pregnancy in television
Television series by CBS Studios
Television series set in the 1950s
Television series set in the 1960s
Television series set in restaurants
Television shows set in Wisconsin
Television shows set in Milwaukee
Nostalgia television shows
Nostalgia television in the United States